Boesmansgat, also known in English as "Bushman's Hole", is a deep submerged freshwater cave (or sinkhole) in the Northern Cape province of South Africa, which has been dived to a depth of .

Boesmansgat was believed to have first been explored by amateur diver Mike Rathbourne, in 1977. Gomes' dive was a close call, as he got stuck in the mud on the bottom of Bushman's Hole for two minutes before escaping.

Deaths 
In 1993, Eben Leyden died after blacking out at a depth of 60 meters (197 ft). Leyden was brought up immediately by diving buddy Boetie Sheun but could not be revived.
On 8 January 2005, Dave Shaw died after becoming tangled in the line while attempting to recover Dreyer's body. (Shaw's close friend and support diver, Don Shirley, nearly died as well and was left with permanent ear damage that has impaired his balance.) On 12 January 2005, Dreyer and Shaw's bodies were ultimately recovered near the surface, while members of the dive team were recovering technical equipment, which included a camera that filmed Shaw’s last moments in the water.

In literature
In Mo Hayder's novel Ritual (2008), the death of the parents of one of the protagonists while diving in Bushman's Hole is an important plot device.

In media
The 2005 attempt to recover Deon Dreyer's body that led to the death of Dave Shaw is the subject of the 2020 documentary Dave Not Coming Back.

References

 
Caves of South Africa
Underwater diving sites in South Africa
Sinkholes of Africa